Samuel Strang Nicklin (December 16, 1876 – March 13, 1932) was a professional baseball player for the Louisville Colonels (1896), Chicago Orphans (1900 and 1902), New York Giants (1901 and 1905–08), Chicago White Sox (1902) and Brooklyn Superbas (1903–04).  He also played college football for the Tennessee Volunteers.

Biography
Strang was born in Chattanooga, Tennessee. He helped the Giants win the 1905 World Series. He led the National League in On-base percentage (.423) in 1906. In 10 seasons he played in 903 games and had 16 home runs, 253 RBI, 216 stolen bases and a .269 batting average.

After his playing career, he was the baseball coach at Georgia Tech in 1902 and Army from 1909 to 1917. Strang died in Chattanooga, Tennessee, at age 55. He was buried in its National Cemetery.

Sammy was a descendant of John Penn, a signer of the Declaration of Independence. He was a distant relative of First Lady Laura Bush.

See also
 List of Major League Baseball career stolen bases leaders

References

External links

  Ancestry of Laura Welch Bush

1876 births
1932 deaths
Major League Baseball third basemen
19th-century baseball players
Louisville Colonels players
Chicago Orphans players
New York Giants (NL) players
Chicago White Sox players
Brooklyn Superbas players
Baltimore Orioles (IL) players
Chattanooga Lookouts managers
Chattanooga Warriors players
Lynchburg Hill Climbers players
Wheeling Stogies players
Cedar Rapids Bunnies players
St. Joseph Saints players
Army Black Knights baseball coaches
Georgia Tech Yellow Jackets baseball coaches
Sportspeople from Chattanooga, Tennessee
Baseball players from Tennessee
Tennessee Volunteers football players
American football halfbacks